Fournet may refer to:

André-Hubert Fournet (1752–1834), French Roman Catholic priest, co-founder of the Sisters of the Cross
Bernard Fournet (born 1941), French hurdler
Douglas B. Fournet (1943–1968), United States Army officer, recipient of the Medal of Honor
Jean Fournet (1913–2008), French flautist and conductor
Jean-Luc Fournet (born 1965), French papyrologist
John B. Fournet (1895–1984), American attorney and politician
Joseph Jean Baptiste Xavier Fournet (1801–1869), French geologist and metallurgist
Louis Dartige du Fournet (1856–1940), French admiral during World War I
Sid Fournet (1932–2011), American collegiate and professional American football player
Sébastien Fournet-Fayard (born 1985), French road cyclist

See also
Le Fournet, commune in the Calvados department in the Normandy region in northwestern France
Fournet-Blancheroche, commune in the Doubs department in the Bourgogne-Franche-Comté region in eastern France
Fournets-Luisans, commune in the Doubs department in the Bourgogne-Franche-Comté region in eastern France
Leonard Fournette (born 1995), American footballer